Laura Curione (born November 9, 1988) is an Italian bobsledder who has competed since 2008. She finished 13th in the two-woman event at the 2010 Winter Olympics in Vancouver, British Columbia, Canada.

Curione finished 14th in the two-woman event at the FIBT World Championships 2009 in Lake Placid, New York.

Her best World Cup finish was 12th on three occasions in 2008 and 2009.

References
 

1988 births
Living people
Bobsledders at the 2010 Winter Olympics
Italian female bobsledders
Olympic bobsledders of Italy
Place of birth missing (living people)